In 1996 the United Nations General Assembly proclaimed that 7 December was to be the International Civil Aviation Day.

The day has been celebrated by the International Civil Aviation Organization (ICAO) since 7 December 1994, the 50th anniversary of the signing the Convention on International Civil Aviation. The purpose of the day is to recognize the importance of aviation, especially international air travel, to the social and economic development of the world. The day is intended is to help generate and reinforce worldwide awareness of the importance of international civil aviation to the social and economic development of States, and of the unique role of ICAO in helping States to cooperate and realize a global rapid transit network at the service of all mankind. As the UN and world nations have now adopted Agenda 2030, and embarked on a new era in global sustainable development, the importance of aviation as an engine of global connectivity has never been more relevant to the Chicago Convention's objectives to look to international flight as a fundamental enabler of global peace and prosperity.

References

External links 
 Official page of International Civil Aviation Day on ICAO website
 The Postal History of ICAO : International Civil Aviation Day
 UN: International Civil Aviation Day

Civil Aviation Day, International
Civil Aviation Day, International
Civil Aviation Day, International
Civil Aviation Day, International
International air transport
December observances